State Highway 37 is a state highway that runs from the Oklahoma border near Albion to Mineola in the northeast corner of the state.

History

 SH 37 was designated as a route on April 13, 1918 from Clarksville to Lufkin. On August 21, 1923, it was pared back, with everything north of Mt. Vernon either cancelled or transferred to the new SH 66, and the portion from Jacksonville to Lufkin transferred to SH 40. On May 23, 1927, it was extended north to Talco. On June 24, 1931, it was extended north to the Oklahoma border, replacing SH 66. On July 15, 1935, everything north of Clarksville was cancelled. The section north of Clarksville was restored on December 20, 1937. On September 26, 1939, the stretch from Mineola to Tyler was transferred to U.S. Highway 69 (Cosigned with since 1934), with the remaining route continuing to the present.

SH 37A was designated on January 19, 1920 as a spur from Tyler to Troup. This was cancelled on November 27, 1922. SH 37A was restored on February 18, 1924, but from Tyler to New Summerfield. It was cancelled on March 19, 1930, as it became part of SH 110. 

SH 37A was also designated on April 23, 1929 from Quitman to Cooper. This was renumbered to SH 154 on March 19, 1930.

Major intersections

Business routes
SH 37 has two business routes.

Clarksville business loop
Business State Highway 37-C is a business loop that runs through Clarksville. The road was bypassed in 1992 by SH 37. It is concurrent with Business US 82.

Mount Vernon business loop
Business State Highway 37-E is a business loop that runs through Mount Vernon. The route was created on February 27, 1997 when SH 37 was routed west of town.

See also

 List of state highways in Texas
 List of highways numbered 37

References

External links

037
Transportation in Wood County, Texas
Transportation in Franklin County, Texas
Transportation in Red River County, Texas